Eugenio Trías Sagnier (31 August 1942 – 10 February 2013) was a Spanish philosopher. Critics have likened his work to Ortega y Gasset in the philosophical literature written in Spanish.

Biography 
Trías was born in Barcelona.  After obtaining his bachelor's degree in philosophy at the University of Barcelona in 1964, he continued his studies in Pamplona, Madrid, Bonn and Cologne. Since 1965 he was assistant professor and, later, associate professor of Philosophy at the University of Barcelona (UB) and the Universitat Autònoma of Barcelona (UAB). In 1976 he became assistant professor of aesthetics and composition at the School of Architecture of Barcelona. In 1986 he became Chair of Philosophy at this University, where he remained until 1992. In 1992 he became Chair Professor of Philosophy at the Pompeu Fabra University in Barcelona, where he remained as a professor of History of Ideas until his death. Trias died in his home city at age 70.

Trias published over thirty-five books, some of which have had several editions in Spain and abroad. His work is regarded by the critics as one of two most significant philosophical pillars of the contemporary Spanish thought. His first book, The philosophy and its shadow, published in 1969, was called as "the philosophy of a new generation" (Josep Maria Carandell).

Thought 
Trías had an encyclopedical conception of philosophy and worked in fields including ethics, politics, aesthetics, philosophy of religion, philosophy of history, theory of knowledge, and ontology. His personal conception of ontology, usually called the philosophy of Limit," informed much of his work.

In chronological order, the main topics of Trias' philosophical works have been:

 The shadows of the philosophical theories
 The reason of the irrational
 The artists and their society 
 The Sinister as the limit and condition of beauty
 Passionate love as the basis of intelligence
 The Modernity crisis
 The human condition as a bordering existence
 The religious experience
 The beauty and the sacred
 A new ethics as an ethics of limit
 The musical turn of the Philosophy

In The Sirens Chant' and The Sonorous Imagination Trias argued that the philosophy of the 21st century must draw upon musical aspects over language, since the former represents the most perfect synthesis of beauty and knowledge.

 His main contributions to philosophy 
Trias considers himself as an "illuminist exorcist" who exposes philosophical reason to a permanent dialogue with their shadows. As an alternative to logical positivism, the analytical philosophy or Marxist thought, he extended reason to spheres including irrationality and the madness (Philosophy and carnival); the mythical and magical thought (Methodology of magical thought); passionate love (Treaty on passion); the Sinister (The beauty and the sinister) as a shade of the categories of beauty and the sublime which founded traditional aesthetics; or the world of religions as the shadow of modern Western reason (The age of the Spirit).

The most significant innovation of Trías' philosophy appeared in the early 1980s, when he discussed the concept of limes ("limit"). 

 Concept of limit 
His concept of the limit is the result of an intense dialogue with the Kantian tradition, Wittgenstein and Heidegger, and a commentary on Wittgenstein's statement "subject is a limit of the world." Trías proposed that being (whose issue has always been the main question for Western philosophy from its origins) may be understood as "being of limit" -- that is, the border area that separates as well as joins the phenomena and the noumena. That limit is also the boundary between the reason and its shadows. Whereas in Kant's thought there was not such a limit or borderline that merges and splits the phenomenon and the thing-in-itself, Trias held that such a limit exists. He argued that it is a precarious, delicate, subtle but fundamental, and the being that philosophers intend to define. Trias develops an anthropology in which the person is conceived as an inhabitant of the being's limit. On this respect, person is always referred to the abovementioned limit, which for Trias has an ontological significance.

 Prizes and awards 
 In 1974 he received the New Critics Award for his book Drama and identity In 1975 he received the Anagrama Essay Award for The artist and the city In 1983 he was awarded with the Spanish National Essay Prize for Beauty and the sinister In 1995 he received the Ciutat de Barcelona Award, for The age of the Spirit In 1995 he won the 13th Friedrich Nietzsche Prize for his collected philosophical works. This award (won also by other distinguished thinkers such as Popper, Rorty or Derrida) is, in its absence, an equivalent to the Nobel Prize of Philosophy, due to the fact that it is the only international award given to a philosopher in recognition of his entire career. Eugenio Trias is the only philosopher in Spanish language who has received this award.
 In 1997 he was awarded with the Medal of the City of Buenos Aires
 In 2000 the Autonomous University of Santo Domingo (UASD) gave Trias an Honoris Causa Doctorate
 In 2003 the National University of San Marcos Lima (UNMSM) gave him an Honoris Causa Doctorate
 In 2004 he received the Gold Medal of the Circulo de Bellas Artes de Madrid
 In 2006 the Autonomous University of Madrid (UAM) gave Trias – together with Jose Saramago – an Honoris Causa Doctorate
 In 2007 his best-seller book The Sirens chant received two awards as the best essay of the Year: the Terenci Moix and the Qwerty prizes
 In 2009 he received the Mariano de Cavia Award, for his article The great travel, published by the ABC newspaper
 In 2010 he received the Creation Prize of Extremadura, an official award
 He has been Vice-president of the Reina Sofia National Museum (Madrid) and Chairman of the Advisory Council of the Institute of Philosophy at the Centro Superior de Investigaciones Cientificas of Spain.

 Works 

 Philosophy and its shadows (1969, three editions)
 Philosophy and Carnival (1970, 3 editions)
 Theory of ideology (1970, 3 editions)
 Methodology of magical thought (1971)
 Drama and identity (1973, 3 editions)
 The artist and the city (1975, 3 editions)
 Meditation on power (1976, 2 editions)
 The lost memory of things (1977, 2 editions)
 Treaty on passion (1978, 5 editions)
 The language of forgiveness. An essay on Hegel (1979)
 Beauty and the Sinister (1981, 5 editions)
 Philosophy of the future (1984, 2 editions)
 The world's limits (1985, 2 editions)
 The philosophical adventure (1987)
 Limit's logic (1991)
 The tiredness of the West (1992, 4 editions), with Rafael Argullol
 The age of the Spirit (1994, 3 editions)
 Thinking religion (1997, 2 editions)
 Vertigo and passion (1998, 2 editions)
 The borderline reason (1999)
 City over city (2001)
 The life's tree (2003)
 The truth's thread (2004)
 Politics and its shadow (2005)
 The Sirens chant (2007)
 Philosophical creations (2009), a selection of his collected works (2 volumes)
 The sonorous imagination'' (2010)

References

Spanish philosophers
1942 births
2013 deaths
Academic staff of Pompeu Fabra University
Writers from Barcelona